Dick's Coffee House was a significant Irish coffeehouse in the 17th and 18th century.

Dick's was one of Dublin's most famous and long lasting coffeehouses, established by Richard Pue in the late 17th century, at some point before July 1698. Pue was a bookseller and owned one of Ireland's earliest newspapers, Pue's Occurences. Dick's was housed in Skinner's Row (now Christchurch Place), on the drawing room floor of Carberry House, which had previously been the home of the Earl of Kildare.

The London bookseller, John Dunton, held auctions in Dick's in 1698. Pue ran his printing workshop from the same premises, printing for a number of Dublin publishing houses. Thomas Bacon held auctions in Dick's from the 1760s, and printed his paper the Dublin Gazette from there for a time. Land and property auctions were also held from Dick's from the 1720s.

The customers of Dick's were described in 1740: "Ye citizens, gentlemen, lawyers and squires, Who summer and winter surround our great fires, Ye quidnuncs! who frequently come into Pue's, To live upon politicks, coffee, and news."

After Richard Pue's death in 1722, his wife Elizabeth ran the coffee house and printing business, which in turn their son Richard Pue (Junior) took over from her by 1731. The business then passed to Richard's nephew, James Pue and his wife Sarah. The printer and bookseller, Sarah Cotter, operated from the coffee house from 1751 to 1774, taking over from her brother who worked from there from 1744 until his death in 1751.

The coffee house closed around 1780, when Carberry House was demolished.

See also
 English coffeehouses in the 17th and 18th centuries
 Bewley's

References

Further reading 
 Morash, Christopher (2010), A History of the Media in Ireland, Cambridge University Press.

Coffeehouses and cafés
Restaurants in Dublin (city)
17th century in Ireland
18th century in Ireland
Demolished buildings and structures in Dublin
Buildings and structures demolished in 1780